Victorious Festival is a three-day music festival held in Portsmouth, United Kingdom. It was founded in 2011. In its first year, the festival was named the Victorious Vintage Festival. For the first two years, the festival was held in Portsmouth Historic Dockyard, while subsequent years were held in the Castle Field and Southsea Common areas of Southsea. 

Southsea Castle, Southsea Skatepark, the D-Day Museum and other local attractions are within the festival boundaries and are only accessible to ticket holders during that time. In 2016, the organizers announced the launch of a charity, the Victorious Foundation, which seeks to protect disadvantaged children. Part of the proceeds from ticket sales is given to the local D-Day Museum. In 2015, the festival's impact on the Common and the smell from waste caused complaints from the residents. 

The 2017 festival extended the duration to include a first night party headlined by Madness. Camping facilities were provided for the 2017 festival at a site at Farlington playing fields after camping on Southsea Common was ruled out. Portsmouth City Council has agreed to allow the festival until 2027 and hoped that the festival would bring over £5.8m a year for the local economy. In 2017, a majority stake in the festival was sold to Global Entertainment with the hopes that bigger acts may be secured in future. Superstruct Entertainment, the live entertainment platform backed by Providence Equity Partners, owns the festival after it entered definitive agreement for the acquisition of several live music and entertainment festivals from Global Media & Entertainment in April 2019.
The daily capacity of the 2019 festival was 65,000.

The 2020 edition of the festival was cancelled in May 2020 due to the COVID-19 pandemic, but returned the following year.

Lineups

External links
 Victorious Festival official website

References

2012 establishments in England
Music festivals in Hampshire
Music festivals established in 2012
Portsmouth